Michel Duran, pen name of Michel Joseph Durand (22 April 1900, in Lyon – 18 February 1994, in Rambouillet) was a French actor, author, dialoguist and screenwriter. He was the son of Michel Jacques Durand and Marie Exbrayat.

On 14 June 1940 he married Marie Thérèse Henriette Théodora Besnard, granddaughter of the painter Albert Besnard but they hd no child.

Television 
 1964: , televised musical comedy by Henri Spade (screenwriter)
 1968:  : Boléro, mise-en-scène Alfred Pasquali, directed by Pierre Sabbagh, Théâtre Marigny
 1969: Au théâtre ce soir : La mariée est trop belle by Michel Duran, mise-en-scène Jacques Mauclair, directed by Pierre Sabbagh, Théâtre Marigny
 1972: Au théâtre ce soir : Faites-moi confiance, mise-en-scène Alfred Pasquali] directed by Pierre Sabbagh, Théâtre Marigny
 1977: Au théâtre ce soir : Bonne Chance Denis, mise-en-scène Claude Nicot, directed by Pierre Sabbagh, Théâtre Marigny

Cinema 
 1922: La Femme de nulle part by Louis Delluc (a young man)
 1924: La Galerie des monstres by Jaque Catelain (actor)
 1931: Amours viennoises by Jean Choux and Robert Land
 1933: Paris-Soleil by Jean Hémard (screenwriter and dialoguist under the pseudonym Michel Mourguet)
 1934: Mauvaise Graine by Billy Wilder and Alexander Esway (actor : the lieder)
 1934: Le Bonheur by Marcel L'Herbier (dialoguist)
 1937: Alexis, gentleman-chauffeur by Max de Vaucorbeil (actor : Dornach)
 1938: Beautiful Star by Jacques de Baroncelli (screenwriter and dialoguist)
 1938: S.O.S. Sahara by Jacques de Baroncelli (dialogue and adaptation)
 1939: Fric-Frac by Claude Autant-Lara and Maurice Lehmann (screenwriter) 
 1939: Le Grand Élan by Christian-Jaque (dialoguist)
 1940: Beating Heart by Henri Decoin (dialoguist)
 1941: Péchés de jeunesse by Maurice Tourneur (screenwriter)
 1941: Premier rendez-vous by Henri Decoin (screenwriter)
 1942: Prince Charming  by Jean Boyer (screenwriter)
 1942: La fausse maîtresse by André Cayatte (actor and dialoguist)
 1944: Cécile est morte by Maurice Tourneur (dialoguist)
 1945: Fausse alerte by Jacques de Baroncelli (screenwriter)
 1945: The Last Metro by Maurice de Canonge (dialoguist)
 1946: The Ideal Couple by Bernard Roland and Raymond Rouleau (dialoguist)
 1946: We Are Not Married by Bernard Roland (screenwriter)
 1946: Madame et son flirt by Jean de Marguenat (dialoguist)
 1947: En êtes-vous bien sûr ? de Jacques Houssin (dialoguist)
 1948: Les Aventures des Pieds-Nickelés by Marcel Aboulker (screenwriter)
 1952: Allô je t'aime by André Berthomieu (dialoguist)
 1953: Plume au vent by Louis Cuny (dialoguist)
 1959: Mon pote le gitan by François Gir (dialoguist)
 1964: Male Hunt by Édouard Molinaro (screenwriter)

Theatre

Author 
 1931: Amitié under the name Michel Mourguet, directed by Raymond Rouleau, Théâtre du Marais Bruxelles
 1932: Amitié under the name Michel Mourguet, directed by Raymond Rouleau, Théâtre des Nouveautés, Théâtre Saint-Georges
 1934: Liberté provisoire, directed by Jacques Baumer, Théâtre Saint-Georges
 1936: Trois...Six...Neuf..., directed by Jean Wall, Théâtre Michel 
 1938: Barbara, Théâtre Saint-Georges
 1939: Nous ne sommes pas mariés, Théâtre des Bouffes-Parisiens
 1940: Nous ne sommes pas mariés, Théâtre Saint-Georges, Théâtre de Paris 
 1941: Boléro, directed by Alfred Pasquali, Théâtre des Bouffes-Parisiens 
 1942: Trois...Six...Neuf..., directed by Roland Armontel, Théâtre de Paris
 1946: Bonne Chance Denis, directed by Raymond Rouleau, Théâtre de l'Œuvre
 1947: Liberté provisoire, Théâtre Sarah Bernhardt
 1947: Boléro, Théâtre Édouard VII
 1948: Premier Rendez-vous operetta written with Henri Decoin, music René Sylviano, premiered in Nancy 22 December 1948, then at Gaîté Lyrique
 1949: Sincèrement, directed by Alice Cocéa, Théâtre des Capucines
 1950: La mariée est trop belle,  
 1952: Sincèrement, directed by Alice Cocéa, Théâtre de l’Ambigu
 1953: Faites-moi confiance, directed by Jean Meyer, Théâtre du Gymnase
 1954: La Roulotte, Théâtre Michel
 1955 : José, Théâtre des Nouveautés
 [1957 : Mon cœur balance, directed by Alice Cocéa, Casino municipal de Nice, Théâtre des Arts

Comedian 
 1924: Chacun sa vérité and Un imbécile by Luigi Pirandello, directed by Charles Dullin, Théâtre de l'Atelier
 1925: La Femme silencieuse by Ben Jonson, directed by Charles Dullin, Théâtre de l'Atelier
 1926: La Comédie du bonheur by Nikolai Evreinov, directed by Charles Dullin, Théâtre de l'Atelier
 1930: Patchouli by Armand Salacrou, directed by Charles Dullin, Théâtre de l'Atelier
 1934: Liberté provisoire by Michel Duran, directed by Jacques Baumer, Théâtre Saint-Georges
 1954: La Roulotte by Michel Duran, directed by Alfred Pasquali, Théâtre Michel
 1955: L’Amour fou ou la première surprise by André Roussin, directed by the author, Théâtre de la Madeleine

References

External links 
 

20th-century French dramatists and playwrights
Male actors from Lyon
French male screenwriters
20th-century French screenwriters
Writers from Lyon
1900 births
1994 deaths
20th-century French male writers